Clangs is a live album by soprano saxophonist Steve Lacy featuring a double sextet, which was recorded in Germany in 1992 and released on the Swiss hat ART label in 1993.

Reception

The Allmusic review by Thom Jurek called it "a mixed bag" observing "the set is long on poetics and short on swinging or blowing aesthetics ...  this is an experiment that, with the exception of one track, didn't work".

Track listing
All compositions by Steve Lacy
 "The Owl" – 6:53
 "Torments" – 10:52
 "Tracks" – 7:30
 "Dome" – 16:29
 "The New Moon" – 11:15

Personnel
Steve Lacy – soprano saxophone
Steve Potts – alto saxophone, soprano saxophone
Hans Kennel – trumpet
Glenn Ferris – trombone
Irene Aebi – voice
Nicholas Isherwood – voice
Bobby Few –  piano
Eric Watson – piano
Sonhando Estwick – vibraphone
Jean-Jacques Avenel – bass 
John Betsch – drums
Sam Kelly – percussion

References

Steve Lacy (saxophonist) live albums
1993 live albums
Hathut Records live albums